Sector No Limits and Sector are Italian wristwatch and diving watch brands by homonymous company.

History
It was founded  in 1973 by Filippo Giardiello, in Naples, Italy, then also owner of Philip Watch and later the company was established in Neuchâtel, Switzerland. In 2001, it passed ownership to the BVLGARI's Opera Group and moved headquarters to Lugano, canton of Ticino, Switzerland. Since 2006 it is owned by the Morellato Group, basically manufacturers of jewellery, in Fratte di Santa Giustina in Colle near Padova, Italy, and is no longer active in Switzerland. From the founding, this brand is ever oriented to athletes.  Sector makes Men's and Women's watches for sports enthusiasts around the world, especially sea divers.

Watch Types 
Sector No Limits originally developed watches starting with the 1000 series SECTOR NO LIMITS brands.  Then they made the 2500, ADV 3000, 4500, 5500 and 7500 models, all as a part of the Swiss ownership starting in 1973 and ending in 2000.  These are vintage Sector watches that are collectible and sturdy, you can purchase them used and New Old Stock (NOS) on auction websites.  They were sold and distributed all over Europe, Asia, and the United States.  Sector currently manufactures watches and they started over with the 100, 200, 300, 400, 500, 600, 700, 800, and 900 series and these can be purchased as new watches on Sector's website as well as other popular B2C websites.

Testimonials
Angela Bandini, Francisco Ferreras or Pipin, Chris Sharma, Simone Origone, Alessandro Ballan, Damiano Cunego, Maurizio Zanolla or Manolo, Jorge Lorenzo (until 05.11.15 when the contract was written off as a result of Valentino Rossi-Marc Marquez Sepang's 2015 GP controversy), and Vittorio Brumotti have given testimonials of this brand.
However, the most famous testimonial for SECTOR sport watches was Umberto Pelizzari, record holder in freediving, and  French skysurfer Patrick de Gayardon.

References

External links
Official website
Sector No Limits: History

Manufacturing companies established in 1973
Italian companies established in 1973
Italian brands
Watch brands
Watch manufacturing companies of Italy